Two ships of the British Royal Navy have been named HMS Cadiz:

 The first Cadiz was a fire ship purchased in 1688 and expended in 1692 at the Battle of Barfleur.
She was transferred to the Pakistani Navy in 1957 and renamed Khaibar.

References
 

Royal Navy ship names